Macrotristria sylvara is an Australian species of cicada in the family Cicadidae, commonly known as the northern cherrynose or green cherrynose.  It is distributed from the Torres Strait down the Queensland coast to about Ingham. Its habitat includes coastal bushland, open forest and parks. Adults appear from December until March, and have green markings on the face, thorax and forewing costal vein, with yellow and brown on the thorax and abdomen. The wingspan ranges from 48 to 62 mm.

References

Hemiptera of Australia
Insects described in 1901
Macrotristriini
Cicadidae genera